The Solirubrobacterales are an order of Actinomycetota.

See also
 List of bacterial orders

References

Actinomycetota